Grigore Brâncuș (March 20, 1929, Peștișani, Romania – April 2, 2022, Bucharest) was a Romanian linguist and philologist, member of the Romanian Academy.

Activity

Brâncuș completed his university studies at the Faculty of Philology of the University of Bucharest in 1953, the same University where he would continue his academic activity for nearly half a century 18 of them as the head of the Department of Romanian Language. Brâncuș completed his PhD in Historical Linguistics and Balkanology under the supervision of Alexandru Rosetti and was known for his research in the interlinguistic relations between Albanian and Romanian.

In 2017, he was awarded the Order of the Star of Romania, Knight rank.

Selected works

 “B. P. Hasdeu, lingvist și filolog” (1968);
 “Limba română contemporană. Morfologia verbului” (1976)
 “Limba română. Modele de analiză gramaticală” (1996); 
 “Gramatica limbii române. Morfologia, în colaborare” (1998); 
 „Introducere în istoria limbii române” (2002); 
 “Istoria cuvintelor. Unitate de limbă și cultură românească” (2004); 
 “Studii de istorie a limbii române” (2007); 
 “Expresie populară în ciclul „La Lilieci” de Marin Sorescu” (2014).

References

1929 births
2022 deaths
Linguists from Romania
Romanian philologists
University of Bucharest alumni
People from Gorj County
Knights of the Order of the Star of Romania
Titular members of the Romanian Academy